In mathematical physics, a caloron is the finite temperature generalization of an instanton.

Finite temperature and instantons
At zero temperature, instantons are the name given to solutions of the classical equations of motion of the Euclidean version of the theory under consideration, and which are furthermore localized in Euclidean spacetime. They describe tunneling between different topological vacuum states of the Minkowski theory. One important example of an instanton is the BPST instanton, discovered in 1975 by Belavin, Polyakov, Schwartz and Tyupkin. This is a topologically stable solution to the four-dimensional SU(2) Yang–Mills field equations in Euclidean spacetime (i.e. after Wick rotation).

Finite temperatures in quantum field theories are modeled by compactifying the imaginary (Euclidean) time (see thermal quantum field theory). This changes the overall structure of spacetime, and thus also changes the form of the instanton solutions. According to the Matsubara formalism, at finite temperature, the Euclidean time dimension is periodic, which means that instanton solutions have to be periodic as well.

In SU(2) Yang–Mills theory
In SU(2) Yang–Mills theory at zero temperature, the instantons have the form of the BPST instanton. The generalization thereof to finite temperature has been found by Harrington and Shepard:

where  is the anti-'t Hooft symbol, r is the distance from the point x to the center of the caloron, ρ is the size of the caloron,  is the Euclidean time and T is the temperature. This solution was found based on a periodic multi-instanton solution first suggested by 't Hooft and published by Witten.

References and notes

Bibliography

Gauge theories